The Deschênes District (District 3) is a municipal district in the city of Gatineau, Quebec. It is represented on Gatineau City Council by Caroline Murray of Action Gatineau.

The district is located in the Aylmer sector of the city. It is one of five districts in the sector. The district includes the neighbourhoods of Deschênes, Parc-Champlain, Lakeview-Terrasse, Mountain View, Kilroy Crescent part of Parc-Connaught and a number of new subdivisions in the north and east part of the former city of Aylmer.

In 2013, the District lost some territory to the new Plateau District.

In 2021, the District lost the eastern half of Lakeview-Terrasse as well as Parc-Champlain to the new Mitigomijokan District.

Councillors
André Touchet (2001-2002)
Richard Jennings (2002-2005)
Alain Riel (2005–2013)
Richard M. Bégin, Action Gatineau (2013-2017)
Mike Duggan (2017-2021)
Caroline Murray, Action Gatineau (2021-present)

Election results

2001

2002 by-election

2005

2009

2013

2017

2021

References

External links
Results
Map

Districts of Gatineau